Donald Ray Cosey (born February 15, 1956) is a former American Major League Baseball pinch hitter. He played for the Oakland Athletics during the  season.

References

Oakland Athletics players
Baseball players from California
1956 births
Living people